Calvin Lashon Woods (born April 3, 1999), professionally known as Calboy, is an American rapper, singer, and songwriter. In 2017, Calvin had a break through locally with his mixtapes released through Paper Gang Inc., Anxiety and Calboy, the Wild Boy.

In 2018, he came to prominence after the release of his viral song "Envy Me", later serving as the lead single from his debut EP, Wildboy, released on May 31, 2019, after signing a new major label deal with Polo Grounds Music and RCA Records.

Early life 
On April 3, 1999, Calvin Lashon Woods was born on the South Side of Chicago; he later relocated to Calumet City, Illinois. Woods turned to music to channel the frustrations of growing up below the poverty line. He is one of five children raised by a single mother.

Woods witnessed two of his best friends die, one of a drug overdose and the other to gun violence. His family migrated between small homes to small apartments.

Career

2016–2017: Career beginnings 
On July 7, 2017, Calboy released his debut mixtape, The Chosen One. on Paper Gang Inc. Later that year, Calboy released his second mixtape, Anxiety, on December 7, 2017.

2018–2021: Numerous mixtapes, EPs and RCA Records 
On June 18, 2018, Woods released his third mixtape, Calboy, the Wildboy. A single off the project was titled, "Unjudge Me", which featured Moneybagg Yo.

He released his single "Envy Me" on September 13, 2018, to critical acclaim. It later served as the lead single from his debut EP Wildboy, released on May 31, 2019. "Envy Me" peaked at number 31 on the Billboard Hot 100 and was certified triple platinum by the Recording Industry Association of America (RIAA). With the single's success came the signage of Calboy to Polo Grounds Music, distributed by RCA Records. At the time, the label had already ended their partnership with ASAP Rocky following the May release of his third album, Testing. It was also rumored that Calboy also signed a management deal with Meek Mill's label, Dream Chasers, but he hinted that he left the label in 2021 after a financial disagreement.

The Wildboy EP was followed by another EP, Long Live the Kings, released in March 2020, with the latter receiving a deluxe version the following July, including 6 new tracks. On August 11, Calboy was included on XXLs 2020 Freshman Class.

On March 22, 2021, "Miseducation" featuring fellow rapper Lil Wayne was released as the lead single from Calboy's debut album, Redemption, supposed to be released the same year, but was postponed. Swae Lee was also set to make an appearance on the album. Calboy claimed that the album was completed.

As recent as February 2022, Calboy publicly disclosed his frustrations with Polo Grounds and RCA Records, believing he was being treated like a "label slave".

Artistry

Influences 
Woods has cited his influences as Tupac Shakur, Michael Jackson, Sherwood, Fuel, Chance the Rapper, The Starting Line, Chief Keef, New Found Glory, G Herbo, The All American Rejects, and 50 Cent.

Woods' rap moniker comes from combining his government name Calvin and the character Cowboy from the 1979 cult film The Warriors.

Discography

Mixtapes

Extended plays

Singles

Guest appearances

Tours

Headlining 
Rockstar Wild Boyz Tour (2019)

Supporting act 
 Dying to Live Tour  (2019)
 I Am > I Was Tour  (2019)

Notes

References 

1999 births
Living people
21st-century American male musicians
People from Calumet City, Illinois
Rappers from Chicago
Songwriters from Illinois
African-American songwriters
21st-century African-American musicians
Dream Chasers Records artists
RCA Records artists